Nanyi Lake() is a freshwater lake in China, it is situated in south of Anhui Province, between Xuanzhou District and Langxi County.

Notes

Lakes of Anhui